Syed Waseem Akhtar (9 September 1956 – 3 June 2019) was a Pakistani politician who had been a Member of the Provincial Assembly of the Punjab, between 1990 and May 2018.

Early life and education
He was born on 9 September 1956 in Lahore.

He has a degree of Bachelor of Medicine and Bachelor of Surgery which he obtained in 1980 from Quaid-e-Azam Medical College.

Political career
He ran for the seat of the Provincial Assembly of the Punjab as a candidate of Islami Jamhoori Ittehad (IJI) from Constituency PP-222 (Bahawalpur-V) in 1988 Pakistani general election but was unsuccessful. He received 11,752 votes and lost the seat to a candidate of Pakistan Peoples Party (PPP).

He was elected to the Provincial Assembly of the Punjab as a candidate of IJI from Constituency PP-271 (Bahawalpur-V) in 1990 Pakistani general election. He received 32,382 votes and defeated a candidate of Pakistan Democratic Alliance.

He ran for the seat of the Provincial Assembly of the Punjab as a candidate of Pakistan Islamic Front (PIF) from Constituency PP-271 (Bahawalpur-V) in 1993 Pakistani general election but was unsuccessful. He received 5,312 votes and lost the seat to a candidate of Pakistan Muslim League (N) (PML-N).

He was re-elected to the Provincial Assembly of the Punjab as a candidate of Muttahida Majlis-e-Amal from Constituency PP-271 (Bahawalpur-V) in 2002 Pakistani general election. He received 21,078 votes and defeated a candidate of PPP.

He was re-elected to the Provincial Assembly of the Punjab as a candidate of Jamaat-e-Islami Pakistan from Constituency PP-271 (Bahawalpur-V) in 2013 Pakistani general election.

Death
He died on 3 June 2019 at age of 62 following a brief illness.
His funeral was offered in Bahawalpur.

References

Punjab MPAs 2013–2018
1956 births
2019 deaths
Jamaat-e-Islami Pakistan politicians
Punjab MPAs 1990–1993
Punjab MPAs 2002–2007